Hasel may refer to:
 Hasel, Germany, a town in the district of Lörrach in Baden-Württemberg in Germany
 Hasel (Mindel), a river of Bavaria, Germany, tributary of the Mindel
 Hasel (Werra), a river of Thuringia, Germany, tributary the Werra
 Hasel (Haune), a river of Hesse, Germany, tributary of the Haune
 Hasel (Orb), a river of Hesse, Germany, tributary of the Orb
 HASELL or HASEL, a mnemonic in aviation

People with the surname
 Gerhard Hasel (1935–1994), Seventh-day Adventist theologian